Yunist Stadium may refer to any of several stadiums in Ukraine:

 Yunist Stadium (Chernihiv), home of the FC Yunist Chernihiv in Chernihiv, Chernihiv Oblast 
 Yunist Stadium (Horishni Plavni), home of the FC Hirnyk-Sport Horishni Plavni in Horishni Plavni (formerly named Komsomolsk), Poltava Oblast
 Yunist Stadium (Ivano-Frankivsk), in Ivano-Frankivsk, Ivano-Frankivsk Oblast
 Yunist Stadium (Kalinine), home of FC Feniks-Illichovets Kalinine in Kalinine, Krasnohvardiiske Raion, Crimea
 Yunist Stadium (Kolomyia), home of FC Karpaty Kolomyia in Kolomyia, Ivano-Frankivsk Oblast
 Yunist Stadium (Lviv), home of the RC Batyari in Lviv, Lviv Oblast
 Yunist Stadium (Varva), home of the FC Fakel Varva in Varva, Chernihiv Oblast 
 Yunist Stadium (Yaremche), hosted the 2012 Amateur League championship match in Yaremche, Ivano-Frankivsk Oblast

Sports venues in Ukraine